Roma Bahn (1896–1975) was a German stage and film actress. On stage she was notable for her performances as Polly in the original 1928 production of The Threepenny Opera. In cinema she played supporting roles in films made during the Weimar and Nazi eras.

Selected filmography
 From Morn to Midnight (1920)
 Unheimliche Geschichten (1932)
 Anna and Elizabeth (1933)
 Scandal at the Fledermaus (1936)
 The Girl Irene (1936)
 The Deruga Case (1938)
 Three Fathers for Anna (1939)
 Detours to Happiness (1939)
 Police Report (1939)
 Madame Butterfly (1939)
 Diesel (1942)
 The Crew of the Dora (1943)
 Wild Bird (1943)
 Mask in Blue (1943)
 The Wedding Hotel (1944)
 Amico (1949)
 Turtledove General Delivery (1952)
 The Phantom of the Big Tent (1954)
 Like Once Lili Marleen (1956)
 Confess, Doctor Corda (1958)

References

Bibliography 
 John Fuegi. Brecht and Company: Sex, Politics, and the Making of the Modern Drama. Grove Press, 2002.

External links 
 

Actresses from Berlin
1896 births
1975 deaths
German film actresses
German stage actresses
Officers Crosses of the Order of Merit of the Federal Republic of Germany